Centella asiatica, commonly known as gotu kola, kodavan, Indian pennywort and Asiatic pennywort, is a herbaceous, perennial plant in the flowering plant family Apiaceae. It is native to tropical regions of Africa, Asia, Australia, and islands in the western Pacific Ocean. It is consumed as a culinary vegetable and is used in traditional medicine.

Description
Centella grows in temperate and tropical swampy areas in many regions of the world. The stems are slender, creeping stolons, green to reddish-green in color, connecting plants to each other. It has long-stalked, green, rounded apices which have smooth texture with palmately netted veins. The rootstock consists of rhizomes, growing vertically down. They are creamish in color and covered with root hairs.

The flowers are white or crimson in color, born in small, rounded bunches (umbels) near the surface of the soil. Each flower is partly enclosed in two green bracts. Each flower bears five stamens and two styles. The fruit are densely reticulate, distinguishing it from species of Hydrocotyle which have smooth, ribbed or warty fruit. The crop matures in three months, and the whole plant, including the roots, is harvested manually. It is a highly invasive plant, rated as "high risk". Centella has numerous common names in its regions of distribution.

Habitat
Centella asiatica is indigenous to the Indian subcontinent, Southeast Asia, parts of Australia, and wetland regions of the Southeastern US. Because the plant is aquatic, it is especially sensitive to biological and chemical pollutants in the water, which may be absorbed into the plant. It can be cultivated in drier soils as long as they are watered regularly enough (such as in a home garden arrangement).

Chemistry

Centella contains pentacyclic triterpenoids and trisaccharide derivatives, including asiaticoside, brahmoside, asiatic acid, and brahmic acid (madecassic acid). Other constituents include centellose, centelloside, and madecassoside.

Culinary use

In Burmese cuisine, raw pennywort is used as the main constituent in a salad mixed with onions, crushed peanuts, bean powder and seasoned with lime juice and fish sauce. Centella is used as a leafy green in Sri Lankan cuisine, being the predominantly locally available leafy green, where it is called . It is considered nutritious. In addition to finely chopped  plants, the  may be eaten with grated coconut, diced shallots, lime (or lemon) juice, and sea salt. Additional ingredients are finely chopped green chilis, chili powder, turmeric powder, or chopped carrots. The Centella fruit-bearing structures are discarded from the  due to their intense bitter taste. The porridge is accompanied with jaggery for sweetness. Centella leaves are also used in modern sweet pennywort drinks and herbal teas.

In Indonesia, the leaves are used for sambai oi peuga-ga, an Aceh type of salad, and is also mixed into asinan in Bogor. In Cambodia, Vietnam and Thailand, this leaf is used for preparing a drink or can be eaten in raw form in salads or cold rolls. In Bangkok, vendors in the Chatuchak Weekend Market sell it alongside coconut, roselle, chrysanthemum, orange and other health drinks. In Malay cuisine it is known as pegaga, and the leaves of this plant are used for ulam, a type of vegetable salad. C. asiatica is widely used in various Indian regional cuisines.
In Bangladesh and India (specifically in West Bengal), Centella is called Thankuni Pata and used in various dishes, one of the most appetising of which is the pakora-like snack called Thankuni Patar Bora; made of mashed Centella, lentils, julienne-ed onion and green chilli.

Traditional medicine 
In traditional medicine, C. asiatica has been used to treat various disorders and minor wounds, although clinical efficacy and safety have not been scientifically confirmed. Contact dermatitis and skin irritation can result from topical application. Drowsiness may occur after consuming it. The herb may have adverse effects on liver function when used over many months.

Agriculture 
In the context of phytoremediation, C. asiatica is a potential phytoextraction tool owing to its ability to take up and translocate metals from root to shoot when grown in soils contaminated by heavy metals.

Gallery

References

Mackinlayoideae
Edible Apiaceae
Dietary supplements
Flora of temperate Asia
Flora of tropical Asia
Plants used in Ayurveda
Plants used in traditional African medicine
Plants used in traditional Chinese medicine
Plants described in 1753
Taxa named by Carl Linnaeus